Linnaisten vihreä kamari (The Green Chamber of Linnais) is a Finnish film from 1945 directed by Valentin Vaala. Mixed with elements of horror and romance, it is based on an 1859 novel The Green Chamber of the Linnainen Mansion (Linnaisten kartanon viheriä kamari) by Zachris Topelius.

The film represents the style of pure escapism with its mansion settings filled with romances, wrong identities and centuries-old secrets. It was the most watched Finnish premiere film of 1945 and went on to win three Jussi Awards; Rauli Tuomi for best actor in a leading role, Eino Heino for best cinematography and Roy for best production design.

Reception 

Linnaisten vihreä kamari received mixed reviews. It was noted for achieving to create a genuine historical-romantic atmosphere. Also the acting, cinematography and production design were praised. On the other hand, some critics mentioned that the film failed to modernize the themes of the original novel.

Main cast 

Rauli Tuomi as Kaarle Lithau
Regina Linnanheimo as Anna Littow
Kaija Rahola as Ringa Littow
Paavo Jännes as Karl Sigismund Littow / Jaakko von Littow
Eine Laine as Winterloo
Reino Valkama as Eusebius Winterloo
Ture Junttu as Spiegelberg
Mailis Vaaja as Adelaide Triste-Ruban
Arvi Tuomi as Holming
Henny Waljus as Justiina
Erkki Kalakari as Rosengreni
Elli Ylimaa as Renata Weder
Arvo Lehesmaa as Weder

References

1945 films
1945 horror films
Finnish horror films
Finnish black-and-white films